Solita may refer to:
 Solita, Caquetá, a town and municipality in Caquetá Department, Colombia
 "Solita" (Prince Royce song)
 "Solita" (Kali Uchis song)
 "Solita", a song by PrettyMuch
 Solita (company), a Finnish technology company